Neutral alpha-glucosidase AB is an enzyme that in humans is encoded by the GANAB gene.

Interactions 

GANAB has been shown to interact with PTPRC.

References

Further reading